Xiong Sheng was the fourth viscount of the state of Chu during the early Zhou Dynasty (1046–256 BC) of ancient China.  Like other early Chu rulers, he held the hereditary noble rank of viscount first granted to his great-grandfather Xiong Yi by King Cheng of Zhou.  Xiong Sheng succeeded his father Xiong Dan and was succeeded by his younger brother, Xiong Yang.

References

Monarchs of Chu (state)
Year of birth unknown
Year of death unknown